Dinah Beth Manoff (born January 25, 1956) is an American stage, film, and television actress and television director. She is best known for her roles as Carol Weston on Empty Nest, Elaine Lefkowitz on Soap, Marty Maraschino in the film Grease, and Libby Tucker in both the stage and film adaptations of I Ought to Be in Pictures, for which she won a Tony Award.

Early life
Manoff was born in New York City to actress, director, and writer Lee Grant, and screenwriter Arnold Manoff. Her half-brother, Tom Manoff, is the classical music critic for NPR's All Things Considered and a notable composer. Her stepfather is producer Joseph Feury.

She spent her childhood and teenage years in New York City and Malibu, California. She attended the New Lincoln School and Santa Monica High School and later studied at the Actors Studio. Manoff is Jewish.

Career

1970s 
Manoff's first project was the independent film Everybody Rides the Carousel, providing one of the voices. In 1976, she made her first television appearance on the PBS production of The Stronger. This was followed by a guest appearance on Welcome Back, Kotter in the episode "Sadie Hawkins Day", followed by an appearance in Visions. In 1977, she made a cameo appearance in her first TV movie, Raid on Entebbe.

In 1978, Manoff got the role of Elaine Dallas (née Lefkowitz) on the ABC sitcom Soap, and remained on the show until the end of the year. Manoff made her film debut in 1978 as Marty Maraschino, one of the Pink Ladies, in the movie version of Grease.

1980s
In 1980, Manoff made her Broadway debut as Libby Tucker in Neil Simon's Broadway play, I Ought to Be in Pictures. For her work in the play, she won the Tony Award for Best Performance by a Featured Actress in a Play, as well as the Theatre World Award. She reprised that role for the film version in 1982, with Walter Matthau and Ann-Margret. Also in 1980, Manoff appeared as Karen, the suicidal friend of Timothy Hutton's character, in the multiple Oscar-winning Ordinary People.

In 1985, Manoff portrayed songwriter Ellie Greenwich in the Broadway jukebox musical Leader of the Pack. In 1988, she played Maggie Peterson in Child's Play, the first character to be killed by the murderous, possessed doll Chucky. Manoff then started a seven-year stint as Carol Weston on the NBC sitcom Empty Nest which was a spin off of The Golden Girls, a role for which she is best known on television, and appeared in every episode of the series. In 1989, Manoff appeared in minor roles in two films late in the year: Bloodhounds of Broadway and Staying Together.

1990s
In 1990, Manoff appeared in Welcome Home, Roxy Carmichael, starring Winona Ryder and Jeff Daniels. After this, Manoff focused primarily on television work, appearing in a cameo role in an episode of Blossom entitled "Rockumentary" and TV movies such as Babies and Maid for Each Other, as well as continuing on Empty Nest as actress and director on two episodes until its ending in 1995; she also appeared on The Golden Girls twice as Carol Weston in this period. Manoff's subsequent TV appearances included Touched by an Angel, Cybill, and George and Leo.

In 1999, Manoff directed the 82nd episode of the television series Sabrina the Teenage Witch, titled "Prelude to a Kiss".

2000s–present
In 2000, Manoff appeared in the TV movie The Lost Child starring Mercedes Ruehl. Just a few months later in 2001, Manoff returned to film work by starring in The Amati Girls, the sole movie released theatrically in which her mother and she have appeared together. The film also featured Mercedes Ruehl, Sean Young, and Lily Knight. Manoff appeared in a second 2001 movie, Zigs, starring Beverly Hills, 90210'''s Jason Priestley. From 2001 to 2002, Manoff co-starred in the cable television series State of Grace. In 2003, Manoff played Aunt Marla in A Carol Christmas, a variation on Charles Dickens' classic story.

In celebration of the poet Oscar Wilde's 150th birthday in 2004, Manoff read some of his works in the documentary Happy Birthday Oscar Wilde. After a four-year hiatus, Manoff appeared in the film Bart Got a Room in 2009, which premiered at the Tribeca Film Festival, but was not released widely until the following year, when Dinah also appeared in two episodes of Lose Yourself on Strike.TV.

In 2010, Grease'' was released a second time as a sing-along. Coinciding with its release, Manoff appeared at the Seattle International Film Festival.

Personal life
Manoff is the daughter of actress Lee Grant and screenwriter Arnold Manoff. Since 1997, she has been married to realtor Arthur Mortell, and currently resides in Bainbridge Island, Washington. The two have three sons together: Dashiell Mortell and twins, Desi and Oliver Mortell. Dashiell was killed in an automobile accident on January 7, 2017, age 19.

She was married to French designer Jean-Marc Joubert from 1980 to 1985.

Selected filmography

References

External links

 

20th-century American actresses
21st-century American actresses
Actors Studio alumni
Actresses from New York City
American film actresses
American musical theatre actresses
American people of Russian-Jewish descent
American stage actresses
American television actresses
American television directors
Contestants on American game shows

Living people
Tony Award winners
American women television directors
1956 births